"Celestial Navigation" is the fifteenth episode of the first season of the American serial political drama The West Wing. The episode aired on February 16, 2000 on NBC. The episode depicts Josh Lyman narrating a story from the past few days to a collegiate audience, as well as the President's nominee to the Supreme Court being arrested for drunk driving. The episode was widely regarded as lighter and more humorous than other episodes of The West Wing.

Cast

Plot 
At the opening of the episode, Sam Seaborn tells Josh Lyman that the President's nominee for the Supreme Court of the United States, Roberto Mendoza, has been arrested for drunk driving and resisting arrest. Sam Seaborn stresses that Mendoza doesn't drink alcohol, telling C. J. Cregg that Mendoza was arrested for "driving while being Hispanic". Sam and Toby fly to Westchester County Airport to drive to Wesley, Connecticut, where Mendoza is being held.

Josh, finishing his conversation with Sam, sits down with an interviewer at a lecture hall to speak about his time working in the White House in front of an audience. Asked to describe a typical day at the White House, he narrates a story from two days before, with flashbacks interspersed throughout. Josh begins his story with Sam, C. J., and Toby Ziegler preparing for a press conference to promote President Bartlet's new initiatives for public education. Sam and C. J. want to push the press conference to 1 pm, after a bill signing, but C. J. has a dentist appointment at noon. Sam moves the briefing anyway.

Meanwhile, the secretary for Housing and Urban Development, an African American woman, called a prominent congressman racist while testifying before Congress. Secretary O'Leary told Congressman Wooden that he and his Republican colleagues more interested in "scoring political points on the backs of poor people and minorities" than he was in solving the problems facing public housing. At the bill signing for the President's education initiative, the President was asked by Washington Post reporter Danny Concannon whether he thought Congressman Wooden was also a racist, and whether or not O'Leary should apologize for her remarks. The President initially sidestepped the question, but eventually remarked that "O'Leary had gone too far in assigning motive", and agreed that she should apologize. O'Leary was summoned to the White House to talk to Leo McGarry, where he tells her that she has to apologize. O'Leary objects, arguing that she was right and that apologizing would be contrary to her role as the highest-ranking African-American in the government. McGarry counters that the White House needs Republican support to pass legislation, and that her primary role is to serve the President. McGarry tells O'Leary that the President has to fire her if she doesn't apologize.

Meanwhile, C. J. has cotton put in her mouth that renders her unable to speak clearly and brief the press, due to an emergency "woot canal". Instead of cancelling the briefing, Josh convinces C. J. to let him conduct the briefing. Danny Concannon, seeing Josh enter the press room, warns Josh not to conduct the briefing, but Josh brushes him off, telling him that the reporters have been "coddled". Josh makes several disastrous blunders during the briefing, including calling a reporter's question "stupid", inventing a "secret plan to fight inflation" from the President when no such plan existed, and stating that the President had not smoked a cigarette in years, when he in fact had borrowed a cigarette from a reporter a few days prior, while on Air Force One. Josh is briefly excoriated and mocked for his performance in the press room by C. J., Toby, and Sam, before Sam informs the group that Mendoza had publicly rebuked the President for asking Secretary O'Leary to apologize. Mendoza was summoned from his vacation in Nova Scotia to come to the White House, but Mendoza informed them that he would be taking several days to arrive, driving down from Nova Scotia to Washington, D.C., stopping to go antiquing in Connecticut, where he was arrested.

Sam and Toby, meanwhile, have gotten lost on their way to find Mendoza. Sam had been attempting to use celestial navigation, using the North Star as a fixed point, although the star in question turned out to be the Delta Shuttle from LaGuardia Airport. When they do find the police station, Sam and Toby speak to the officers, explaining that they are from the White House and that Mendoza needs to be released. The officers are skeptical, but a newspaper clipping with an image of Toby next to the President proves their story. While Toby is talking to Mendoza, the sergeant on duty tells Sam that Mendoza's driving was faulty, and that he wasn't sure that Mendoza hadn't been drinking alcohol. Sam responds by informing the officers that Mendoza has a chronic illness that would render any significant drinking fatal. During Toby's conversation with Mendoza, he expressed frustration at how he'd been treated by the police, telling Toby that he'd been searched and handcuffed by police in front of his wife and nine-year old son. Mendoza vowed to use the criminal justice system to acquit himself, instead of letting the White House get him out, but Toby countered that Mendoza could make a much bigger difference on the Supreme Court, and that he would be unable to be confirmed by the U.S. Senate if the story circulates. Toby also sympathized with Mendoza's desire to not face his wife and son after what had happened to him. Mendoza agrees to be released, and Toby tells the officers on duty that in exchange for Mendoza's release, and the officers' apologizing to Mendoza and to his son, the incident will remain off the record and no lawsuit will be filed against the county. Mendoza gets in the car with Sam and Toby, and Josh finishes his interview by beginning to take questions from the audience.

Reaction and trivia 
Steve Heisler, writing for The A.V. Club, describes the episode as "the flat-out funniest West Wing I've seen", complimenting Allison Janney's performance as C. J. when she has cotton in her mouth. He also noted Donna's line to Josh after his press briefing, where she tells Josh to "go to your office, and come up with a secret plan to fight inflation". Heisler praises Edward James Olmos for his vigor and introspection in his scene with Toby, and said that he wanted to see more characters reveal what motivates them.

Liz Shannon Miller with IndieWire included the episode in a list of episodes "Binge View in Celebration of America". Miller noted Josh's scene where he created a "secret plan to fight inflation", and noted that while the episode wasn't "plot heavy... it is a delight".

The Guardian included the episode in its list of the top ten episodes of The West Wing. They contrasted the episode to "In Excelsis Deo", an episode earlier in the season, noting that the tone of "Celestial Navigation" was much lighter. The Guardian praised Aaron Sorkin for his successful experimentation with the format of the show, incorporating flashbacks. They also highlighted a line from Josh—"It starts off as a nine-to-five job, but you can pretty much count on it being blown to hell by 9.30"—that they said encapsulated the show's narrative well.

Writing for the Daily Bruin, Alex Driscoll briefly praised the episode's format of interwoven plotlines and the episode's combination of past in present in letting Josh narrating backstory to an ongoing plotline before focusing on Mendoza's being racially profiled. Driscoll writes that while Mendoza was released quietly and quickly, many cases of a victim being racially profiled do not have the same outcome. She praises Sorkin for providing attention to the point that race can matter more than guilt or innocence in determining how a suspect is treated by police. Driscoll notes in her October 2020 article that most suspects in this case will not have powerful members of the U.S. government to bail them out, and said that forms of protest similar to Mendoza's refusing of a breathalyzer test have spread across the United States.

CCH Pounder, who guest starred as Debbie O'Leary in this episode, was initially considered for the role of C. J. Cregg. Instead, Allison Janney was cast for the role.

References

External links
 

The West Wing (season 1) episodes
2000 American television episodes